Eremophila phyllopoda is a flowering plant in the figwort family, Scrophulariaceae and is endemic to Western Australia. It is an erect or spreading shrub, sometimes round or flat-topped with sticky, hairy leaves and flowers ranging in colour from pink or lilac to purple.

Description
Its branches and leaves are covered with a layer of silvery to dull grey simple hairs that are sometimes stained brown. The branches are rough due to the prominent, projecting leaf bases and sticky due to the presence of resin. The leaves are arranged alternately and clustered near the ends of the branches.

The petal tube is white through pink to deep lilac-coloured or purple on the outside, white inside. The petal tube and lobes are hairy on the outside, the petal lobes are glabrous on the inside, and the inside of the tube is filled with woolly hairs. The 4 stamens are fully enclosed in the petal tube. Flowering time depends on subspecies.

Taxonomy and naming 
The species was first formally described by Robert Chinnock in 2007 and the description was published in Eremophila and Allied Genera: A Monograph of the Plant Family Myoporaceae. The specific epithet (phyllopoda) means "leaf-foot", referring to the prominent leaf bases of this species that persist well after the leaves have fallen.

In the same monograph, Chinnock described two subspecies and the names are accepted by the Australian Plant Census:

Distribution and habitat
Subspecies phyllopoda occurs stony plains and rocky ridges from west of Mt Augustus to Meekatharra in the Carnarvon, Gascoyne, Little Sandy Desert, Murchison  and Pilbara biogeographic regions.  Subspecies obliqua is found in stony soils near creek beds and on rocky hills between the Collier and Barlee ranges in the Gascoyne and Pilbara biogeographic regions.

Conservation
Both subspecies of E. phyllopoda are classified as "not threatened" by the Western Australian Government Department of Parks and Wildlife.

Use in horticulture
This is one of the most attractive eremophilas with its grey, pendulous leaves and mass display of lilac to blue or pink flowers. Its colourful sepals remain on the plant long after the petal tube has fallen and it is an ideal container plant. It is usually propagated by grafting onto Myoporum rootstock and grown in well-drained soil in full sun. It only needs occasional watering during a long drought but it is frost sensitive and needs to be grown in a warm, protected position.

References

Eudicots of Western Australia
phyllopoda
Endemic flora of Western Australia
Plants described in 2007
Taxa named by Robert Chinnock